Paw Paw Creek is a  tributary of the Monongahela River in West Virginia.

Course
The headwaters of the creek begin in Monongalia County, north of Fairview, and empty into the river in Rivesville, coursing through the Marion County towns of Fairview, Grays Flat, Grant Town, Baxter, and Rivesville.  The stream has a number of tributaries ("runs" or "licks") that empty into the creek along its course, including the Bennefield Prong, Ann's Run, Robinson Run, Panther Lick, Tarney Run, Little Paw Paw, and Woods Run.

The stream is named for the pawpaw tree ''(Asimina triloba), a native fruit-bearing tree of the eastern United States, which grows along its banks.

See also

 List of rivers of West Virginia

References

External links
Topographical depiction of river and area

Rivers of West Virginia
Tributaries of the Monongahela River
Rivers of Marion County, West Virginia
Rivers of Monongalia County, West Virginia